Avni may refer to:

Given name
 Avni Arbaş (1919–2003), Turkish artist
 Avni bej Delvina, a signatory of the Albanian Declaration of Independence
 Avni Klinaku (born 1965), Albanian politician and nationalist
 Avni Mula (1928–2020), Albanian singer
 Avni Özgürel (born 1948), Turkish journalist, author, and screenwriter
 Avni Pepa (born 1988), Norwegian-Albanian footballer
 Avni Qahili (born 1967), Macedonian television presenter, songwriter, and musician
 Avni Rustemi (1895–1924), Albanian teacher, activist, and MP
 Avni Sali (born 1940), Australian surgeon, researcher, author, and media personality
 Avni Spahiu (born 1953), Kosovar politician
 Avni Yildirim (born 1991), Turkish professional boxer
 Avni Zogiani (born 1970), Albanian activist, critic, lawyer, and journalist
 Hüseyin Avni (disambiguation), various Turkish military personnel

Surname
Yosef Avni (1924–2021), Irgun activist
Yossi Avni-Levy (born 1962), Israeli writer and diplomat

Institution
 Avni Institute of Art and Design, art school in Tel-Aviv

Turkish-language surnames
Albanian masculine given names
Turkish masculine given names